Edward Uhler Condon (March 2, 1902 – March 26, 1974) was an American nuclear physicist, a pioneer in quantum mechanics, and a participant during World War II in the development of radar and, very briefly, of nuclear weapons as part of the Manhattan Project. The Franck–Condon principle and the Slater–Condon rules are co-named after him.

He was the director of the National Bureau of Standards (now NIST) from 1945 to 1951. In 1946, Condon was president of the American Physical Society, and in 1953 was president of the American Association for the Advancement of Science.

During the McCarthy period, when efforts were being made to root out communist sympathizers in the United States, Edward Condon was a target of the House Un-American Activities Committee on the grounds that he was a 'follower' of a 'new revolutionary movement', quantum mechanics; Condon defended himself with a famous commitment to physics and science.

Condon became widely known in 1968 as principal author of the Condon Report, an official review funded by the United States Air Force that concluded that unidentified flying objects (UFOs) have prosaic explanations. The lunar crater Condon is named for him.

Background

Edward Uhler Condon was born on March 2, 1902, in Alamogordo, New Mexico, to William Edward Condon and Carolyn Uhler. His father was supervising the construction of a narrow-gauge railroad, many of which were built in the area by logging companies. After graduating from high school in Oakland, California in 1918, he worked as a journalist for three years at the Oakland Inquirer and other papers.

He then attended the University of California, Berkeley, initially joining the College of Chemistry; when he learned that his high school physics teacher had joined the faculty, he switched majors to take classes in theoretical physics. Condon earned his bachelor's degree in three years and his doctorate in two. His Ph.D. thesis combined work by Raymond Thayer Birge on measuring and analyzing band spectral intensities and a suggestion by James Franck.

Thanks to a National Research Council fellowship, Condon studied at Göttingen under Max Born and at Munich under Arnold Sommerfeld. Under the latter, Condon rewrote his Ph.D. thesis using quantum mechanics, creating the Franck–Condon principle. After seeing an ad in Physical Review, Condon worked in public relations at Bell Telephone Laboratories in fall 1927, in particular promoting their discovery of electron diffraction.

Career

Early career

Condon taught briefly at Columbia University and was associate professor of physics at Princeton University from 1928 to 1937, except for a year at the University of Minnesota. With Philip M. Morse, he wrote Quantum Mechanics, the first English-language text on the subject in 1929. With G.H. Shortley, he wrote the Theory of Atomic Spectra, "a bible on the subject from the moment of its 1935 publication".

He was associate director of research at the Westinghouse Electric Company in Pittsburgh, beginning in 1937, where he established research programs in nuclear physics, solid-state physics, and mass spectroscopy. He then headed the company's research on microwave radar development. He also worked on the equipment used to isolate uranium for use in atomic bombs. He served as a consultant to the National Defense Research Committee during World War II and helped organize MIT's Radiation Laboratory. On May 11, 1940, Condon showcased his machine called the Nimatron at the 1940 New York World Fair. Condon filed for the patent on April 26, 1940 and got it on September 24, 1940 for his innovating machine, Nimatron.

Government service

In 1943, Condon joined the Manhattan Project. Within six weeks, he resigned as a result of conflicts about security with General Leslie R. Groves, the project's military leader. General Groves had objected when Condon's superior J. Robert Oppenheimer held a discussion with the director of the project's Metallurgical Lab at the University of Chicago. In his resignation letter, he explained:

From August 1943 to February 1945, Condon worked as a part-time consultant at Berkeley on the separation of U-235 and U-238. Condon was elected to the National Academy of Sciences in 1944. Following the war, Condon played a leading role in organizing scientists to lobby for civilian control of atomic energy rather than military control under strict security. He worked as science adviser to Senator Brien McMahon, chairman of the Senate Special Committee on Atomic Energy, which wrote the McMahon-Douglas Act, enacted in August 1946, that created the Atomic Energy Commission, placing atomic energy under civilian control. Adopting an internationalist viewpoint, Condon favored international scientific cooperation and joined the American-Soviet Science Society. Condon was elected to the American Academy of Arts and Sciences in 1947.

U.S. Commerce Secretary (and former U.S. Vice President) Henry A. Wallace came to know Condon and in October 1945 recommended him as director of the National Bureau of Standards (NBS, now known as NIST).  President Harry S. Truman agreed to nominate him. The Senate confirmed his nomination without opposition.  Condon served as NBS director until 1951.
 He was also president of the American Physical Society in 1946.  Condon was also either a member or associated with the Independent Citizens Committee of the Arts, Sciences and Professions (ICCASP). He was elected to the American Philosophical Society in 1949.

Attacks

1940s

During the 1940s, Condon's security clearance status was repeatedly questioned, reviewed, and re-established.

On May 29, 1946, FBI Director J. Edgar Hoover wrote a letter intended for President Truman that named several senior government officials as part of a Soviet network. It described Condon as "nothing more or less than an espionage agent in disguise." (Decades later Senator Daniel Patrick Moynihan called it "baseless corridor talk.") The Truman administration ignored Hoover's charges.

On March 21, 1947, Truman signed United States Executive Order 9835 AKA the "Loyalty Order."  In the same month, Congressman J. Parnell Thomas, head of the House Un-American Activities Committee (HUAC), furnished information to the Washington Times-Herald that denigrated his loyalty in two articles published. Thomas had several reasons to make a prominent case of Condon. He had no sympathy for the scientific community's international spirit in the first place and could use the ongoing controversy to argue for an increase in his committee's appropriation, to bolster opposition to the Condon-supported McMahon Act, and to attract favorable coverage during election season. The Department of Commerce cleared Condon of disloyalty charges on February 24, 1948.

Nevertheless, a HUAC report dated March 2, 1948 stated, "It appears that Dr. Condon is one of the weakest links in our atomic security".  Condon responded: "If it is true that I am one of the weakest links in atomic security that is very gratifying and the country can feel absolutely safe for I am completely reliable, loyal, conscientious and devoted to the interests of my country, as my whole life and career clearly reveal". On March 3, 1948, Senator Dennis Chávez (Dem-NM) read into the Congressional Record an article by Marquis Childs, which stated:

On March 5, 1948, Representative George MacKinnon (Rep-MN) stated: "Mr. Speaker, today's paper carries the story that the Secretary of Commerce, Mr. Harriman, has refused to respond to a congressional subpoena to supply information with respect to one Dr. Condon. I am not presuming to pass on the facts in that case, but I do wish to point out that this follows the same pattern of Secrecy as the administration has been following with respect to congressional subpoenas throughout this entire session."  On March 6, 1948, a Washington Post editorial stated, "There is an abundance of precedent for the Secretary's refusal to turn over his department's loyalty board files on Dr. Edward U. Condon." The Post also objected to an alternative proposal to send files on the Condon case to the top-level "Loyalty Review Board" in the Civil Service Commission.  The Commerce Department's own loyalty board had already cleared Condon, and the Post argued that this decision should stand.  On March 8, 1948, Representative Chester E. Holifield (Dem-CA) noted:  "...calling the attention of the Members to H. R. 4641, a bill which I introduced December 4, 1947.  The purpose of this bill is to prescribe the procedures of investigating committees of the Congress and to protect the rights of parties under investigation by such committees. If this bill could be enacted, it would extend to a world-famous scientist, such as Dr. E. U. Condon, the same protection which is now available to a chicken thief or a traffic violator; that is, the right of defense against his accusers.  Character assassination under the cloak of congressional immunity by a Member of Congress or a Congressional committee is a dangerous and abominable travesty."  On March 9, 1948, Representative Glen H. Taylor (Dem-ID), then Progressive Party vice presidential candidate, stated:

On the same day, Representative Emanuel Celler (Dem-NY) stated:

On the same day, Representative Leo Isacson (ALP-NY) stated, "It is no coincidence that this attack on Dr. Condon—an attack abhorred and shamed in all responsible opinion of press and science comes at this particular moment—at this moment when the House Committee on Un-American Activities seeks the most swollen appropriation it has ever Ventured to ask of a Congress."  Holifield added, "The technique used by the committee counsel is biased and prejudiced ... We have a flagrant example ... in the partial report on Dr. Condon ... I want to comment here on the use of the word 'partial' ... The committee counsel omitted a line of the [FBI] letter ... 'There is no evidence to show that contacts between this individual and Dr. Condon were related to this individual's espionage activities' ... This man, Dr. Condon, has been pilloried before the American people now for over 8 months. He has asked for a chance to tell his story; that chance has been denied"

Defenders included Albert Einstein and Harold Urey. The entire physics department of Harvard and numerous professional organizations wrote Truman on Condon's behalf. The Emergency Committee of Atomic Scientists held a dinner on April 12, 1948, to demonstrate support, with nine Nobel Prize winners among the sponsors. The National Academy of Sciences, by contrast, considered only a statement criticizing HUAC's procedures rather than defending Condon. Despite widespread support among its members (275 to 35), the National Academy of Sciences' leadership did not release a statement, and instead opted to speak privately with Rep. Thomas. On July 15, 1948, the Atomic Energy Commission granted Condon a security clearance, allowing him to access classified information at NIST.

In September 1948, at the Annual Meeting of the American Association for the Advancement of Science (AAAS), President Truman, with Condon sitting nearby on the dais, denounced Rep. Thomas and HUAC on the grounds that vital scientific research "may be made impossible by the creation of an atmosphere in which no man feels safe against the public airing of unfounded rumors, gossip and vilification". He called HUAC's activities "the most un-American thing we have to contend with today. It is the climate of a totalitarian country".  Condon opposed any cooperation with Congressional attempts to identify security risks within the scientific community. In June 1949, in a sharply critical letter to Oppenheimer, who had provided information to HUAC about a colleague, he wrote: "I have lost a good deal of sleep trying to figure out how you could have talked this way about a man whom you have known for so long, and of whom you know so well what a good physicist and good citizen he is." In July 1949, he testified before a Senate subcommittee that was considering rules governing the operation of Senate committees. He criticized Thomas and the HUAC for holding closed hearings and then leaking information that denigrated his loyalty and that of other scientists. He said that the committee denied his and his colleagues' requests for public hearings so they could respond.

In 1949, Edward R. Murrow had colleague Don Hollenbeck contribute to the innovative media-review program, CBS Views the Press over the radio network's flagship station WCBS.  Hollenbeck discussed Edward U. Condon, Alger Hiss, and Paul Robeson.  Regarding Condon, Hollenbeck critiqued anti-communists for going about their business the wrong way:

(Here, Hollenbeck was placing Condon in the "freedom-loving non-Communist" camp.)

1950s

With his record finally cleared in 1951, Condon left government to become head of research and development for the Corning Glass Works. He said his $14,000 annual government salary was his reason for the move. President Truman issued a statement of praise: "You have served in a most critical position with continued and loyal attention to your duties as director, and by reason of your standing among scientists and the supervision you have given to the bureau's activities, you have made of it a more important agency than it has ever been before". Two Republican Congressmen asserted that Condon was being investigated as a security risk and was leaving "under fire", a charge the Secretary of Commerce Charles Sawyer denied.

In 1951, Condon served as president of the Philosophical Society of Washington. On December 27, 1951, Condon was elected to head the AAAS in 1953. In September 1952, Condon, in testimony before a Congressional committee, had his first opportunity to deny under oath all charges of disloyalty that had been made against him. The HUAC concluded in its annual report for 1952 that Condon was unsuited for a security clearance because of his "propensity for associating with persons disloyal or of questionable loyalty and his contempt for necessary security regulations". On December 30, 1952, Condon assumed the presidency of the AAAS at its annual meeting, where, according to the Bulletin of the Atomic Scientists, "The tremendous ovation by his fellow members accompanying his induction was a further affirmation of their faith in his loyalty and integrity".

Five months later Condon's clearance was revoked as was standard when someone left government service. He was granted a security clearance once more on July 12, 1954. It was announced on October 19 and then suspended by Secretary of the Navy Charles S. Thomas on October 21. Vice President Nixon took credit for the suspension, and the Atomic Scientists of Chicago charged "political abuse of the national security system", though Secretary Thomas denied Nixon had played a role. Condon withdrew his application for clearance and in December resigned from Corning because the company was seeking government research contracts and he lacked the clearance necessary for participating in military research. After citing the security reviews he had passed over the years, he said: "I am unwilling to continue a potentially indefinite series of reviews and re-reviews". Corning had paid Condon's clearance-related legal expenses while he worked there.

In 1958, Condon wrote that his decision reflected his belief that the Eisenhower administration "was committed by policy to the persecution of scientists, or, at the very least, to a callous indifference toward what others were doing to attack and discredit them. I decided the situation was hopeless, and that I had done all that could be reasonably expected of me in having resisted these forces for seven long years".

Years later, Carl Sagan reported how Condon described one encounter with a loyalty review board. A board member stated his concern: "Dr. Condon, it says here that you have been at the forefront of a revolutionary movement in physics called ... quantum mechanics. It strikes this hearing that if you could be at the forefront of one revolutionary movement ... you could be at the forefront of another". Condon said he replied: "I believe in Archimedes' Principle, formulated in the third century B.C. I believe in Kepler's laws of planetary motion, discovered in the seventeenth century. I believe in Newton's laws ...." and continued with a catalog of scientists from earlier centuries, including the Bernoulli, Fourier, Ampère, Boltzmann, and Maxwell. He once said privately: "I join every organization that seems to have noble goals. I don't ask whether it contains Communists".

Academia

Condon was professor of physics at Washington University in St. Louis from 1956 to 1963 and then at the University of Colorado Boulder from 1963, where he was also a fellow of the Joint Institute for Laboratory Astrophysics, until retiring in 1970.

From 1966 to 1968, Condon directed Boulder's UFO Project, known as the Condon Committee. He was chosen for his eminence and his lack of any stated position on UFOs. He later wrote that he agreed to head the project "on the basis of appeals to duty to do a needed public service" on the part of the U.S. Air Force Office of Scientific Research.<ref>[[#Dick|Dick, Biological, 293]]</ref> Its 1968 final report - which drew on Project Blue Book information from the USAF, as well as reports collected by two civilian organisations - concluded that unidentified flying objects had prosaic explanations. Blue Book was terminated at the end of 1969 - shortly after the Condon Report reached the general public - and the latter work has been cited as a key factor in the generally low levels of interest in UFOs taken subsequently by mainstream scientists and academics.. A role in this was played by Yuletide reading Condon provided in December 1969, in the form of a 3-page article reproduced in the Bulletin of the Atomic Scientists entitled "UFOs I Have Loved and Lost" and also offered in the Proceedings of the American Philosophical Society. This reflected a talk given to the APS that Physicist Philip McCord Morse described, in his "Biographical Memoir" of Condon, as "light-hearted". While the article/talk begins scientifically, offering a degree of background history of both the phenomenon and the research response to it, it then seeks to preclude reliable witnessing by the public by stressing the "extraordinary degree of disagreement" characterising people's reports of an undisputed event - the atmospheric re-entry of the Soviet Union's Zond IV spacecraft. The tone and tenor of further parts of the article/talk are set by Condon's deploying of the terms "gullible audiences", "pseudo-science organizations", "charlatans", "cultists", the "narrow wobbly line" between science and pseudoscience, "accepted on faith", "astrologers", "spiritualism", "dowsers" and "so-called educated people". The article concludes with a penultimate paragraph holding that: "Perhaps we need a National Magic Agency to make a large and expensive study of all these matters, including the future scientific study  of UFOs, if any"; as well as a final paragraph potentially serving as the Condon Committee take-home message, in which it is noted that: "publishers who publish or teachers who teach any of the pseudo-sciences as established truth should, on being found guilty, be publicly horsewhipped, and forever banned from further activity in these usually honorable professions. Truth and children's minds are too precious for us to allow them to be abused by charlatans".    

Condon was also president of the American Institute of Physics and the American Association of Physics Teachers in 1964. He was President of the Society for Social Responsibility in Science (1968–69) and was Co-Chair of the National Committee for a Sane Nuclear Policy (1970). He co-edited the Handbook of Physics with Hugh Odishaw of the University of Arizona. He received the Frederic Ives Medal awarded by the Optical Society in 1968. On his retirement, his colleagues honored him with the publication of a Festschrift.

Personal life and death

In 1922, Condon married Chicago-born Emilie/Emma Honzik (1899-1974), who was a translator from the Czech language. They had two sons and a daughter. Son Joseph Henry Condon (February 15, 1935 — January 2, 2012) was a physicist (Ph.D., Northwestern University) and engineer, who worked at Bell Labs on digital telephone switches and co-invented the Belle chess computer.

Condon was a Quaker, and a self-described "liberal."

Condon died on March 26, 1974, twenty-four days after his 72nd birthday, in Boulder Colorado Community Hospital. He was cremated and his ashes were scattered. Wife Emma died just over 7 months later.

Legacy

The National Institute of Standards and Technology (NIST) gives an annual award named for Condon.  The Condon Award recognizes distinguished achievements in written exposition in science and technology at NIST. The award was initiated in 1974.

The crater Condon on the Moon is named in his honor.

In his "Biographical Memoir", Philip Morse seeks to sum up Condon's impact with a quote from fellow Physicist Lewis Branscomb which includes: "Watergate came as no surprise to Edward Condon, nor did its aftermath. I imagine he would like to have lived to see the outcome of the impeachment inquiry. But Condon understood and paid his share of the price of liberty. Somehow his idealism, his sense of humor and his inexhaustible energy made his relentless quest for a better world look like optimism."

Works

 Atomic Structure with Halis Odabaşı (1980)

See also

Ronald Wilfred Gurney
Quantum tunnelling
McCarthyism
Anti-communism

Notes

References

Works cited
 
 
 
 
 
 
 
 

External links

 Edward U. Condon Papers @ American Philosophical Society
Alsos Digital Library for Nuclear Resources: Annotated Bibliography for Edward Condon
Oral history interview transcript with Edward Condon on 17 October 1967, American Institute of Physics, Niels Bohr Library & Archives – Session I
Oral history interview transcript with Edward Condon on 27 April 1968, American Institute of Physics, Niels Bohr Library & Archives – Session II
Oral history interview transcript with Edward Condon on 11 September 1973, American Institute of Physics, Niels Bohr Library & Archives – Session III
Oregon State University: Key Participants: Edward Condon – Linus Pauling and the International Peace Movement: A Documentary History''
Bulletin of the Atomic Scientists Feb 1955, statements of Condon, Corning Glass, and the Atomic Scientists of Chicago, concerning Condon's resignation from Corning
National Academy of Sciences Biographical Memoir

1902 births
1974 deaths
American nuclear physicists
Manhattan Project people
People from Alamogordo, New Mexico
UC Berkeley College of Letters and Science alumni
Princeton University faculty
Washington University in St. Louis faculty
Washington University physicists
University of Colorado faculty
University of Colorado Boulder faculty
NIST Directors
Victims of McCarthyism
Fellows of the American Physical Society
Members of the United States National Academy of Sciences
Fellows of the American Association for the Advancement of Science
UFO skeptics
Presidents of the American Physical Society
Members of the American Philosophical Society